Elizabeth Hunt Eddy (born September 13, 1991) is an American soccer player who plays as a midfielder for Houston Dash in the National Women's Soccer League (NWSL).

Early life 
She was born in Costa Mesa, California. She attended University of Southern California. At USC Eddy played for the USC lacrosse and soccer teams.  She was named Female Trojan of the Year for the 2013–2014 school year.

Club career 
After being drafted by Sky Blue FC, she eventually signed with Western New York Flash on May 21, 2015.

Following the 2015 regular season, Eddy went on loan to Okayama Yunogo Belle in Japan's Nadeshiko League. She scored two goals in a 3-1 victory over Yamato Sylphid in the second round of the 2015 Empress's Cup.

In June 2019, she was traded by the North Carolina Courage, the successor to the Flash following relocation, to Sky Blue FC.

In December 2021, Eddy joined Australian club Newcastle Jets on loan for the 2021–22 A-League Women season.

In March 2022, the Houston Dash traded their 2023 natural fourth-round pick for Eddy.

International career 
She was part of the United States U17 and United States U20 national team.

Honors

Club 
Orange County Blues FC
Winner
 W-League (2): 2013, 2014

Runner-up
 W-League: 2012

International 
United States U20
Winner
 CONCACAF Women's U-20 Championship: 2010

United States U17
Runner-up
 FIFA U-17 Women's World Cup: 2008

References

External links 
 
 Western New York Flash player profile 

1991 births
Women's association football midfielders
Western New York Flash players
Living people
National Women's Soccer League players
Soccer players from California
American women's soccer players
Pali Blues players
USC Trojans women's soccer players
USC Trojans women's lacrosse players
NJ/NY Gotham FC draft picks
North Carolina Courage players
NJ/NY Gotham FC players
Newcastle Jets FC (A-League Women) players
United States women's under-20 international soccer players
Houston Dash players